Faith Nona, Lady Mackenzie (née Stone; 26 February 1878 – 9 July 1960), known as Faith Compton Mackenzie, was an author known for memoirs of her travels around Europe.

Early life and education
Faith Nona Stone was born in February 1878, the daughter of Elizabeth Theresa "Lily" Vidal (1841-1898, the only daughter of novelist Mary Theresa Vidal and Rev. Francis Furse Vidal) and Edward Daniel Stone, a Greek and Latin schoolmaster at Eton College. She was one of 10 children, including notable younger brother Christopher Stone, and attended the Francis Holland School for Girls in London. 

Between 1901 and 1905 she was an actress, under the stage name "Faith Reynolds", in Sir Charles Hawtrey's company, appearing in London and New York, initially in his production of A Message from Mars. In 1903 she appeared with Hawtrey and Arthur Playfair in Hawtrey's production of F. Anstey's play The Man from Blankley's in London, New York, Washington DC, Detroit and Chicago. During these years she knew the Irish artist Althea Gyles, on whom the character of Ariadne Burden in Tatting (1957) was later based.

On 30 November 1905, Faith Stone married the writer Compton Mackenzie in St Saviour's, Pimlico.

Career and later life
Between 1913 and 1920, Mackenzie lived with her husband on Capri at Villa Solitaria, an Italian island near Sorrento. Mackenzie was known for her own talent on the piano, and during her time on Capri she had an affair with the Italian pianist Renata Borgatti.

At times, Mackenzie and her husband lived apart. From 1920, Compton Mackenzie was tenant of the Channel Islands of Herm and Jethou. During this time D. H. Lawrence dined with Faith in Capri. She was the inspiration behind the story 'Two Blue Birds', and was unhappy that he had written such a "monstrous perversion of facts" based on their dinner conversation.

From 1930, the Mackenzies lived on the Scottish island Eilean Aigas, and it is from this period onwards that Mackenzie began to write. She began with historical biographies in the early 1930s.

In 1933, the Mackenzies relocated to Barra, where they built a house named 'Suidheachan' (the sitting-down place). She reportedly had a "passion for furnishing new houses" that fortunately matched her husband's passion for acquiring new islands. By the late 1930s, Mackenzie became best known for volumes of memoirs describing her life in places such as Capri, Paris, Rome, Milan, Guernsey and Barra.

By the mid 1940s, the Mackenzies were no longer living on islands and had bought Denchworth Manor near Wantage. In 1950, Lady Mackenzie bought a stuffed tabby cat at Portobello Market that was purported to be Crimean Tom, the famous survivor of the war in Sebastopol. It is now in the National Army Museum. A portrait of Lady Mackenzie from November 1955 is held by the National Portrait Gallery.

Faith Compton Mackenzie died on 9 July 1960.

References

1878 births
1960 deaths
20th-century British women writers
British women memoirists
People from Eton, Berkshire
People educated at Francis Holland School
Wives of knights
English LGBT writers